David Hendry Fenner (1914 – 25 February 1945) was a Scottish footballer who played in the Scottish League for Airdrieonians as an outside left.

Personal life 
Fenner was married. He served as a flying officer with No. 98 Squadron RAF during the Second World War. Fenner was killed in the crash of his B-25 Mitchell bomber at Eethen, German-occupied Netherlands on 25 February 1945 and was buried in Jonkerbos War Cemetery.

Career statistics

References

Scottish footballers
Association football outside forwards
Scottish Football League players
Royal Air Force personnel killed in World War II
Royal Air Force pilots of World War II
1945 deaths
Place of birth missing
Kilsyth Rangers F.C. players
Airdrieonians F.C. (1878) players
Stenhousemuir F.C. players
Manchester United F.C. wartime guest players
Royal Air Force officers
British World War II bomber pilots
Burials at Jonkerbos War Cemetery
1914 births
Scottish military personnel